Giuseppe "Pino" Ammendola (born 2 December 1951) is an Italian actor, voice actor, film director and playwright. He has appeared in  films since 1966.

Selected filmography
 Operazione San Gennaro  (1966)
 Caligula (1979)
 Camorra (A Story of Streets, Women and Crime) (1986)
 Piedipiatti (1991)
 Erotic Tales II (1995)
 Tequila & Bonetti (2000)
 Fade to Black (2006)
 Göta kanal 2 – Kanalkampen (2006)
 Don Matteo 
 Incantesimo

References

External links
 
 Ammendola bei mymovies

1951 births
Living people
Male actors from Naples
Italian male film actors
Italian male voice actors
Italian male television actors
Italian male stage actors
Italian film directors
Italian dramatists and playwrights
20th-century Italian male actors
21st-century Italian male actors